Bertrand Blier (born 14 March 1939) is a French film director and writer.

Filmography

References
 

Blier, Bertrand
Blier, Bertrand